Rafael Blanquer Alcantud (born 14 October 1945) is a Spanish athlete. He competed in the men's long jump at the 1976 Summer Olympics.

References

1945 births
Living people
Athletes (track and field) at the 1976 Summer Olympics
Spanish male long jumpers
Olympic athletes of Spain
Place of birth missing (living people)
Mediterranean Games silver medalists for Spain
Mediterranean Games medalists in athletics
Athletes (track and field) at the 1975 Mediterranean Games